Jay David can refer to:

Jay David (musician) (born 1942), musician who played drums in Dr. Hook and the Medicine Show
Jay David (actor), voice actor in the short film Dorothy Meets Ozma of Oz
Jay David (author), author whose The Flying Saucer Reader inspired Calling Occupants of Interplanetary Craft
An alias of spy Whittaker Chambers

See also

Jason David, American football player